Inquiry  is any process that has the aim of augmenting knowledge, resolving doubt, or solving a problem.

The Inquiry was a study group to prepare materials for the peace negotiations following World War I.

(The) Inquiry may also refer to:
 Inquiry (TV series), a Canadian current affairs television series
 The Inquiry (2006 film), a historical drama
 The Inquiry (1986 film), an Italian historical drama
 Inquiry (health journal)
 Inquiry: An Interdisciplinary Journal of Philosophy, a philosophy journal established in 1958 and published by Routledge
 Inquiry: Critical Thinking Across the Disciplines, a philosophy journal established in 1988 by the Institute for Critical Thinking
 Inquiry (magazine), a libertarian magazine
 "The Inquiry" (short story), a short story by Alexander Kuprin

See also
 Inquiry-based learning
 Public inquiry